The ACC Asian Test Championship was a professional Test cricket tournament contested between the Test playing nations of Asia: India, Pakistan, Sri Lanka and Bangladesh. It is not a regular event in the cricketing calendar and has so far been held only twice; in 1998–99 when Pakistan won and in 2001–02 with Sri Lanka as champions. It was originally planned that the tournament would be held every two years, alternatively with the Asia Cup.

The Asian Test Championship is only the second example of a Test cricket tournament involving more than two teams, the first being the 1912 Triangular Tournament, which was held between Australia, England and South Africa. This tournament was considered to be the predecessor to the Test Cricket World Cup that the International Cricket Council was planning for the 9 member nations.

In 2006, the Asian Cricket Council cancelled the Asian Test Championship, as well as the Asian and African Cup, due to the tightly packed international cricket tour schedule. The third installment of the Championship had been delayed by four years due to conflicting tours of the participating members.

2001–2002 Asian Test Championship

Bangladesh, Pakistan, Sri Lanka competed in the second Asian Test Championship between August 2001 and March 2002. India pulled out of the tournament due to political tensions with Pakistan.
Pakistan and Sri Lanka both played Bangladesh in the two round robin matches. A win was worth 16 points, a tie 8 points and no points were awarded for a draw or loss. In addition to this, bonus points were awarded to teams for bowling and batting performances. Pakistan and Sri Lanka qualified for the final after convincingly beating Bangladesh in Multan Cricket Stadium in Pakistan and Colombo in Sri Lanka.

The final was held at Gaddafi Stadium in Lahore, Pakistan. Sri Lanka defeated Pakistan by 8 wickets to win the second Asian Test championship.

See also
 Asia Cup
 ICC World Test Championship
 Women's Asia Cup

References

 
Test cricket competitions